Kamel Mohamed Seghir Belarbi (born April 11, 1997) is an Algerian footballer who plays for ASO Chlef.

On September 10, 2017, Belarbi made his senior league debut for USM El Harrach, playing the full 90 minutes against JS Kabylie.

Club career

Career statistics

Club

Honours

Club
 USM Alger
 Algerian Ligue Professionnelle 1 (1): 2018–19

References

External links
 

1997 births
Algerian footballers
Algerian Ligue Professionnelle 1 players
Living people
Footballers from Algiers
USM El Harrach players
Association football midfielders
21st-century Algerian people